North Eastern Railway could refer to:

North Eastern Railway (Canada), one of Canada's National Railways companies
North Eastern Railway (India)
North Eastern Railway (United Kingdom)

See also
London and North Eastern Railway
Northern and Eastern Railway
Scottish North Eastern Railway